Eva Minárčiková (born 3 July 1992) is a Slovak handball player for DHC Sokol Poruba and the Slovak national team.

References

1992 births
Living people
Slovak female handball players
Sportspeople from Žilina